The Women's 50 metre butterfly competition at the 2017 Summer Universiade was held on 20 and 21 August 2017.

Records
Prior to the competition, the existing world and Universiade records were as follows.

Results

Heats 
The heats were held on 20 August at 9:30.

Semifinals
The semifinals were held on 20 August at 19:10.

Semifinal 1

Semifinal 2

Final 
The final was held on 21 August at 19:29.

References

Women's 50 metre butterfly